Nowghab-e Pas Kuh (also Romanized as Nowghāb-e Pas Kūh; also known as Nowghāb, Nowqāb, and Nūghāb) is a village in Pishkuh Rural District, in the Central District of Qaen County, South Khorasan Province, Iran. At the 2006 census, its population was 1,263, in 351 families.

References 

Populated places in Qaen County